Efren Torres born La Palma, Mexico,(November 29, 1943 – February 25, 2010) was a Mexican professional boxer, who was world champion in the flyweight division. Torres was born in La Palma, Mexico in 1943, and spent most of his early life in his family town of Guadalajara.

Professional career
Known as "El Alacrán" (the Scorpion), Torres turned pro in 1961 and in 1969 after two unsuccessful bids at a major title, he defeated WBC and Lineal Champion Chartchai Chionoi of Thailand by decision to become the flyweight world champion. He lost the title in his second defense to Chartchai Chionoi by decision in 1970.  He retired in 1972.

Honours
Torres was inducted into the World Boxing Hall of Fame in the Class of 2007.

Professional boxing record

See also
List of flyweight boxing champions
List of WBC world champions
List of Mexican boxing world champions

References

External links
 
 Efren Torres - CBZ Profile

1943 births
Boxers from Michoacán
Flyweight boxers
World boxing champions
World flyweight boxing champions
World Boxing Council champions
2010 deaths
Mexican male boxers